Tonantius Ferreolus may refer to:
 Tonantius Ferreolus (prefect)
 Tonantius Ferreolus (senator)